Rosebank is an unincorporated community in south central Manitoba, Canada. It is located approximately 20 kilometers (12 miles) north of Morden, Manitoba in the Rural Municipality of Thompson.

References 

Unincorporated communities in Pembina Valley Region